Chamaeleo calcaricarens is a species of chameleon found in Ethiopia, Eritrea, Djibouti, and Somalia.

References

Chamaeleo
Reptiles of Ethiopia
Reptiles of Somalia
Reptiles described in 1985
Taxa named by Wolfgang Böhme (herpetologist)